Lieutenant-General George Macartney or MacCartney (c. 1660–1730) was an Irish-born professional soldier who went into exile to escape charges for his role in the 1712 Hamilton–Mohun Duel. He was later acquitted and restored to his military rank.

Personal details
George Macartney was born in 1660, elder son of "Black George" Macartney (1630–1702) who moved from Scotland to Belfast in the 1650s and became an extremely successful merchant. His mother Martha (died 1705) was a daughter of Sir John Davies, Attorney-General for Ireland from 1606 to 1619. His younger brother Isaac served as High Sheriff of Antrim and was the father of William Macartney MP.

In later life, he married Anne Douglas; they had a number of children who predeceased them.

Career

Macartney was intended to follow his father into the family business but volunteered for the army during the Nine Years War, and served with much credit under the Duke of Marlborough and Prince Eugene. After the War of the Spanish Succession began, he was appointed Colonel of a new regiment, McCartney's Regiment of Foot, which initially served under Marlborough in Flanders before being sent to Spain in 1706. He was wounded and captured at the Battle of Almanza, where the regiment suffered heavy casualties; he was quickly exchanged and returned to the Low Countries in 1709, where he served as a volunteer at Malplaquet and subsequently made Major-general. His regiment fought at the sieges of Douai and Béthune in 1710, after which he became Lieutenant-General.

Along with Marlborough and many other Whigs, Macartney was deprived of his positions following the Tory victory in the 1710 British general election. In 1712, he acted as second to the Whig Lord Mohun, in his duel with the Tory Duke of Hamilton, both of whom were killed. It was then common practice for seconds to join the fight and MacCartney and the Duke's second, the unrelated Colonel Hamilton were arrested. Hamilton accused McCartney of having stabbed the Duke while lying on the ground and he escaped to Hanover, where he remained until 1714, when he returned with George I.

Soon after this, he demanded to be tried for the offence which had been laid to his charge, and on the evidence of the keepers of Hyde Park, who had witnessed the duel throughout all its phases, was honourably acquitted. His former regiment having been disbanded at the peace of Utrecht, he was appointed to the colonelcy of the Royal North British Fusiliers on 12 July 1716, from which he was removed on 9 March 1727 to the Carabiniers, and he retained this appointment until his death on 7 July 1730. At the time of his death, he was commander-in-chief of the forces in Ireland  and governor of Portsmouth.

References

External links

1660s births
1730 deaths
Military personnel from Belfast
Irish people of Scottish descent
Irish Protestants
Commanders-in-Chief, Ireland
British Army generals
Carabiniers (6th Dragoon Guards) officers
Scots Guards officers
Royal Scots Fusiliers officers
Scots Guards soldiers
British military personnel of the Nine Years' War
British military personnel of the War of the Spanish Succession
British duellists
People acquitted of murder